Barbodes lanaoensis, known locally as the kandar, is an extinct species of cyprinid fish endemic to Lake Lanao in Mindanao, the Philippines.

References

Barbodes
Freshwater fish of the Philippines
Endemic fauna of the Philippines
Fauna of Mindanao
Fish described in 1924
Taxonomy articles created by Polbot